Ircinia spiculosa is a marine sponge species in the genus Ircinia.

Tryptophol, a plant auxin, can also be isolated from the marine sponge I. spinulosa.

References 

Dictyoceratida
Sponges described in 1912